Mad About Boys was a monthly magazine  in the United Kingdom aimed at girls aged between nine and twelve. First launched in January 2001 by Planet Three Publishing, it attracted controversy over what many saw as adult content, and was banned from many chain stores, including Woolworths and WH Smith. It ceased publication after four issues due to poor sales.

The editor of the magazine, Maria Landolfi, told PR Week: "Our USP is that we feature 12 teen boys aged 13 to 17 and get our readers to vote for the 'boy of the month' by post or on our website".

See also

Moral panic

References

2001 establishments in the United Kingdom
2001 disestablishments in the United Kingdom
Children's magazines published in the United Kingdom
Monthly magazines published in the United Kingdom
Defunct magazines published in the United Kingdom
Magazines established in 2001
Magazines disestablished in 2001
Teen magazines